Phyllonorycter gerfriedi is a moth of the family Gracillariidae. It is known from Crete.

The larvae feed on Quercus coccifera. They mine the leaves of their host plant. They create a lower-surface tentiform mine.

References

gerfriedi
Moths of Europe
Moths described in 2007